The 2002–03 NBA season was the SuperSonics' 36th season in the National Basketball Association. During the off-season, the Sonics acquired Kenny Anderson and Vitaly Potapenko from the Boston Celtics. The Sonics got off to a solid start winning eight of their first ten games, but then lost six of their next seven games, then posted six-game losing streaks in January and February, holding a 21–27 record at the All-Star break. At midseason, before the trading deadline, the team traded All-Star point guard Gary Payton and Desmond Mason to the Milwaukee Bucks in exchange for All-Star shooting guard Ray Allen. More changes continued as Anderson was traded to the New Orleans Hornets in exchange for Elden Campbell. Payton also represented the Western Conference for the final time in the 2003 NBA All-Star Game.

The Sonics, now led by the newly acquired Allen, finished the season fifth in the Pacific Division with a 40–42 record, missing the playoffs. Rashard Lewis averaged 18.1 points, 6.5 rebounds and 1.3 steals per game, while Brent Barry averaged 10.3 points, 5.1 assists and 1.5 steals per game, second-year forward Vladimir Radmanović provided the team with 10.1 points and 4.5 rebounds per game, and second-year center Predrag Drobnjak contributed 9.4 points per game.

Following the season, Drobnjak signed as a free agent with the Los Angeles Clippers, and Campbell signed with the Detroit Pistons.

Offseason

Draft picks

Roster

Regular season

Season standings

z - clinched division title
y - clinched division title
x - clinched playoff spot

Record vs. opponents

Game log

Player statistics

Provided by Basketball-Reference.com: View Original Table Generated 2/17/2017.

Awards and records
 Ray Allen, Player of the Week (Mar. 2)
 Ray Allen, Three-Point Field Goal Leader
 Rashard Lewis, Player of the Week (Nov. 17)

Transactions

References

See also
 2002-03 NBA season

Seattle SuperSonics seasons